Phil Brady (died 6 May 1980) was a Gaelic footballer who played for the Cavan county team. He won All-Ireland Senior Football Championship medals in 1947, 1948, and 1952.

Playing career
Brady was a tough, strong versatile footballer, he scored a point to help Cavan win the All-Ireland Final in the Polo Grounds, New York City in 1947. He formed a brilliant midfield partnership with Victor Sherlock in the 1948 final and he lined out at full-back in the 1952 all-Ireland final. Victor become his brother-in-law in 1953. He also won a National Football League medal in 1949/50 season. He collected a Railway Cup medal with Ulster in 1950.

He is also the uncle of five times world handball champion Paul Brady.

References

Year of birth missing
1980 deaths
Cavan inter-county Gaelic footballers
Garda Síochána officers
Mullahoran Gaelic footballers